Tarmas TV is a Venezuelan community television channel.  It was created in December 2002 and can be seen in the Vargas State of Venezuela on UHF channel 60.  Wilfredo Garcia is the legal representative of the foundation that owns this channel.

As of now, Tarmas TV does not have a website.

See also
List of Venezuelan television channels

Television networks in Venezuela
Television stations in Venezuela
Mass media in Venezuela
Television channels and stations established in 2002
2002 establishments in Venezuela
Television in Venezuela
Spanish-language television stations